Vlastimir Đorđević (Serbian Cyrillic: Властимир Ђорђевић; born 17 November 1948) is a Serbian former police colonel general. For his role in the Kosovo War, he was found guilty of war crimes against Kosovo Albanians before the ICTY.

Early life and education
Đorđević was born in Koznica, Vladičin Han, PR Serbia. He graduated from the University of Belgrade Faculty of Law.

Career
Đorđević was Assistant Minister of the Ministry of Internal Affairs of Serbia, and Chief of the Public Security Department of the Ministry of Internal Affairs. In 1997, Đorđević was promoted from Lieutenant General to Colonel General by presidential decree. He remained the Assistant Minister and Chief of the Public Security Department until January 2001.

ICTY trial and sentence
He was indicted by the ICTY for being part of the 1999 Serb crackdown on Kosovo Albanian citizens. As Chief of the Public Security Department, he was responsible for ensuring that all units of the Public Security Department in Serbia for Kosovo carried out their orders. Until 17 June 2007, he was believed to be in Russia. On the morning of 17 June 2007, Đorđević was arrested in Montenegro, near the city of Budva.

On 23 February 2011, the ICTY ruled Đorđević guilty of all five charges made against him. He was given 27 years' imprisonment. However, the Appeals Chamber of the Hague Tribunal reduced his sentence to 18 years' imprisonment on 27 January 2014.

See also
 Vučitrn massacre
 Operation Horseshoe
 Joint criminal enterprise
 War crimes in the Kosovo War
 Batajnica mass graves

References

External links
Vlastimir Đorđević at icty.org

1948 births
Living people
People indicted by the International Criminal Tribunal for the former Yugoslavia
People convicted by the International Criminal Tribunal for the former Yugoslavia
Serbian generals
People from Vladičin Han
Interior ministers of Serbia